

Notes

Citations

References
 Official episode guide at the Fox website The Simpsons.com. Retrieved March 26, 2012.
 Season 1, 2, 3, 4, 5, 6, 7, 8, 9, 10, 11, 12, 13, 14, 15, 16, 17, 18, 19, 20, 21, 22, 23, 24, 25.

External links
 Guest star list at the Internet Movie Database

Simpsons
Guest stars
Simpsons